Wheatfields is a populated place situated in Apache County, Arizona, United States, right along the border with New Mexico. It is one of two places in Arizona with this name, the other being a CDP in Gila County. In 1909, the US Government set up an irrigation project to assist the Navajo residents. It is a chapter of the Navajo Nation.

References

Populated places in Apache County, Arizona
Navajo Nation